Nicolaescu or Nicolăescu is a Romanian surname that may refer to:

Constantin Nicolaescu
Constantin I. Nicolaescu
Constantin S. Nicolăescu-Plopșor
Eugen Nicolăescu
Ion Nicolăescu
Sergiu Nicolaescu

Romanian-language surnames
Patronymic surnames
Surnames from given names